Andrei Vyacheslavovich Mironov (born 15 January 1987) is a former Russian professional football player.

Club career
He played in the Russian Football National League for FC Nizhny Novgorod in 2009.

External links
 
 

1987 births
Living people
Russian footballers
Association football defenders
PFC Krylia Sovetov Samara players
FC Nizhny Novgorod (2007) players